Michaś Klimkovič (20 November 1899 – 5 November 1954) was a Belarusian poet, librettist, and author. He wrote the lyrics to the Anthem of the Byelorussian SSR, and co-wrote the lyrics to the Anthem of the Republic of Belarus.

Biography
Klimkovich was born into the family of a stoker in the village of Salitranka on November 20, 1899. Finishing a four-year pedagogical institute, he was involved in teaching, subsequently joined the revolutionary communist forces during the collapse of the Russian Empire, fighting in the Red Army during the Russian Civil War. He became a member of the Russian Communist Party (b) in 1920. Between 1932 and 1937 he was a member of the organizinatinal committee in charge of the education activities of the Belarusian Writers' Union before being elected as the Belarusian Writers' Union's first-ever chairman in 1934.

Aside from a number of important poems, Klimkovich authored the dramatic trilogy Georgy Skaryna and wrote librettos for several operas and a ballet.

References 

1899 births
1954 deaths
People from Barysaw District
20th-century Belarusian poets
Communist Party of the Soviet Union members
National anthem writers
People of the Russian Civil War
Soviet poets
Soviet male writers
20th-century male writers
Belarusian male poets